Aminoethylethanolamine or AEEA is an organic base used in the industrial manufacture of fuel and oil additives, chelating agents, and surfactants.

References

Chelating agents
Amines
Primary alcohols